Spatial Concept: Nature is a series of bronze sculptures by Lucio Fontana designed between 1959 and 1960. A series of these sculptures cast in 1965 is installed at the Hirshhorn Museum and Sculpture Garden in Washington, D.C., and a set cast in 1961 is owned by the Walker Art Center and installed in the Minneapolis Sculpture Garden.

See also
 List of public art in Washington, D.C., Ward 2

References

Art in Washington, D.C.
Bronze sculptures in Washington, D.C.
Hirshhorn Museum and Sculpture Garden
Sculptures of the Smithsonian Institution
Outdoor sculptures in Washington, D.C.